Benito Armando Archundia Téllez (born March 21, 1966) is a Mexican former football referee. He is known in Mexico as Armando Archundia, but appears as Benito Archundia in FIFA records. He has been a professional referee since 1985 and has had his FIFA referee permission since 1993. His first fixture as an international referee was the 1994 match between USA and Greece.

Archundia is the all-time leader in appearances at the FIFA World Cup, being one of only two referees who have been appointed for 8 matches, the other being Joël Quiniou. He also shares the record for the most matches officiated in a single World Cup (5 in 2006). The only others who have achieved this feat are Horacio Elizondo in 2006, and Ravshan Irmatov in 2010.

In addition, he has supervised the final of the FIFA Club World Cup twice, in 2005 and 2009.

He originally planned to retire at the end of the 2010 FIFA World Cup, but decided to continue for at least another year. He was the referee in the grand opening of the Estadio Omnilife, which featured Guadalajara vs Manchester United.

In addition to working as a professional referee, Archundia is a lawyer and economist.

World Cup

World Cup 2006
Archundia made his first World Cup appearance in the 2006 FIFA World Cup and refereed a total of five matches, equaling the most matches by an individual referee (along with Argentina's Horacio Elizondo). His final game was the semi-final between Germany and Italy. In general he was one of the most respected and proficient referees at the 2006 World Cup, and give out an average of only 3 cards per game (the lowest of any referee at the competition).

World Cup 2010
His second World Cup appearance was in the 2010 FIFA World Cup and refereed a total of three matches. His final game was the third place play-off between Germany and Uruguay.

Notes

References

External links
 
 
 
 

1966 births
Living people
Sportspeople from the State of Mexico
Mexican football referees
20th-century Mexican lawyers
20th-century Mexican economists
Copa América referees
2010 FIFA World Cup referees
2006 FIFA World Cup referees
CONCACAF Gold Cup referees
CONCACAF Champions League referees
21st-century Mexican lawyers